Nematopsides is a genus of dinoflagellates belonging to the family Warnowiaceae.

Species:

Nematopsides tentaculoides 
Nematopsides vigilans

References

Gymnodiniales
Dinoflagellate genera